Geoffrey H. G. Wyld (born c. 1894) was a rugby union player who represented Australia.

Wyld, a lock, was born in Balgowlah, New South Wales and claimed 1 international rugby cap for Australia.

References

                   

Australian rugby union players
Australia international rugby union players
Rugby union players from Sydney
Rugby union locks